The 1941 Army Cadets football team represented the United States Military Academy in the 1941 college football season. In their first year under head coach Earl Blaik, the Cadets compiled a 5–3–1 record and outscored their opponents by a combined total of 105 to 87.

The season represented a four-game improvement on the prior year's record of 1–7–1. Army opened with four wins, then played a scoreless tie with undefeated Notre Dame at Yankee Stadium. The eleventh-ranked Cadets then lost on the road in consecutive weeks to Harvard  In the annual  the Midshipmen won for the third  
 
Army halfback Hank Mazur was selected by Life magazine as a third-team player on the All-America team. Mazur was also selected by the Associated Press as a second-team player on the 1941 All-Eastern football team.

Schedule

References

Army
Army Black Knights football seasons
Army Cadets football